Chris Pinnick (born July 23, 1953) is an American guitarist and songwriter, probably best known for his work with the band Chicago from 1980–1985.

Pinnick was born on July 23, 1953 in Van Nuys, California and took up the guitar at the age of seven. An early example of his professional guitar work can be heard on Herb Alpert's single "Rise," which reached No. 1 on the Billboard Hot 100 in October 1979.

After guitarist Donnie Dacus left Chicago in 1980, Pinnick was hired as a session musician for the album Chicago XIV. In his biography Street Player, Chicago drummer Danny Seraphine remembers how Pinnick, like [Chicago's] original guitarist Terry Kath, played "guitar with plenty of fire" and had "similar mannerism". Robert Lamm, in an interview given at the time, confirmed that Pinnick's resemblance with Kath was at times "spooky". Pinnick toured with Chicago from 1981 through 1983. By the time Chicago 17 was released in 1984, Pinnick was listed as a member of the band. However, Pinnick himself is quoted as saying he was never a full-fledged member. He left Chicago in 1985 and was succeeded by Dawayne Bailey.

Pinnick's other recording credits include work for one-time Chicago frontman Peter Cetera, Chuck Negron, Chet McCracken and Rick Devin. As of 2008, he continues to do session work in Los Angeles, where he is also the co-owner and operator of a recording studio.

References

American rock guitarists
American male guitarists
Chicago (band) members
1953 births
Living people
People from Van Nuys, Los Angeles
Lead guitarists
Rhythm guitarists
American session musicians
Guitarists from Los Angeles
20th-century American guitarists
20th-century American male musicians